Valkas apriņķis was a historic county in the Governorate of Livonia, and in the Republic of Latvia dissolved during the administrative territorial reform of the Latvian SSR in 1949. Its capital was Valka (Walk).

History 
The county of Valka was created during the administrative territorial reform of the Governorate of Riga in 1783 by merging of parishes from the preexisting Kreis Riga and Kreis Wenden.

After the establishment of the Republic of Latvia in 1918, the Valkas apriņķis existed until 1949, when the Council of Ministers of the Latvian SSR split it into the newly created districts (rajons) of Valka and Smiltene (dissolved in 1959).

Demographics 
At the time of the Russian Empire Census of 1897, Kreis Walk had a population of 120,585. Of these, 87.9% spoke Latvian, 7.2% Estonian, 2.1% German, 1.3% Russian, 1.1% Yiddish, 0.2% Polish and 0.1% Romani as their native language.

References

External links

 
Uezds of the Governorate of Livonia